Fraser Highway is a  major arterial road in the Lower Mainland of British Columbia. Connecting the cities of Surrey and Abbotsford, the highway formerly constituted a major portion of British Columbia Highway 1A until the latter was decommissioned in 2006. The highway is named for the Fraser River and the Fraser Valley, which are in turn named for the explorer Simon Fraser.

The road was one of the first motor highways in British Columbia, being formed from portions of the Old Yale wagon road in the 1920s, and was known as the Inter-Provincial Highway but its importance as an east-west corridor was diminished with the construction of the Trans-Canada Highway in the 1960s. Nonetheless, it remains an important thoroughfare. Running roughly parallel to the Trans-Canada Highway, it is often used as an alternative or feeder route for it.

Route description
The Fraser Highway runs in a generally southeast-northwest direction, roughly paralleling the Trans Canada Highway to the north of it. It alternates back and forth between one lane each direction (total of 2 lanes) to two lanes each direction (total of 4 lanes) between rural and urban surroundings.

Its western terminus is at King George Boulevard and 98th Avenue in the Whalley Town Centre of Surrey, just south of the King George SkyTrain Station. From there, it passes through the mixed residential, commercial, and rural neighbourhoods of Green Timbers, Fleetwood, and Cloverdale.

Leaving Surrey, the route bisects the City of Langley, before entering the more rural neighbourhoods of Murrayville, and Aldergrove in Langley Township.

The eastern terminus is at the Trans-Canada Highway, just east of Mount Lehman Road, in the Clearbrook neighbourhood of Abbotsford.

Major intersections

References

Former British Columbia provincial highways
Former segments of the Trans-Canada Highway
Highways in Greater Vancouver
Transport in Abbotsford, British Columbia
Transport in Langley, British Columbia (city)
Transport in Langley, British Columbia (district municipality)
Transport in Surrey, British Columbia